Kimberly Susan Budil (Kim Budil) is an American physicist who is the 13th and current director of Lawrence Livermore National Laboratory.

Education and career 
Budil received a bachelor of science with a major in physics in 1987 from the University of Illinois Chicago, and a master of science in 1988 and a doctor of philosophy in 1994, both in applied science from the University of California, Davis.

While in graduate school, she worked with future Nobel laureate Donna Strickland, who told her about her impostor syndrome "Stop apologizing for being here – you belong and you are contributing in a real way." She shared her experience and what she learned from it in a book "Find Your Path: Unconventional Lessons from 36 Leading Scientists and Engineers", together with other contributors such as Stephon Alexander.
Her main scientific contribution was in the field of high-power, ultra-fast lasers, participating in the NOVA project, the first inertial confinement fusion project in the world and the predecessor of the National Ignition Facility.

After joining Lawrence Livermore National Laboratory as a scientist in 1987 and later as a postdoc in 1994, she assumed various roles at a wide variety of United States government entities such as the National Nuclear Security Administration, the Department of Homeland Security, the Department of Defense, and the Department of Energy.

In 2014, she became the University of California vice-president for laboratory management, managing relations between the ten campuses and the three Department of Energy labs managed by the University of California (Lawrence Berkeley National Laboratory, Lawrence Livermore National Laboratory and Los Alamos National Laboratory). In 2019, she was principal associate director for Weapons & Complex Integration at LLNL.

In 2019, she was made a fellow of the American Physical Society.

In 2021, she was named as the director of Lawrence Livermore National Laboratory, becoming the first woman to hold the position.

Science advocacy 
Budil has been an early advocate for women in science. She participated in the Lawrence Livermore Laboratory Women's Association and organized numerous technical women's conferences, and she later contributed to international panels such as the American Physical Society's Committee on the Status of Women in Physics.

References 

Living people
American women physicists
University of Illinois Chicago alumni
University of California, Davis alumni
Fellows of the American Physical Society
Year of birth missing (living people)
20th-century American physicists
20th-century American women scientists
21st-century American physicists
21st-century American women scientists
Lawrence Livermore National Laboratory staff